Don Bass may refer to:
 Don Bass (American football)
 Don Bass (wrestler)